Thomas B. Jones was a Virginia businessman and politician, serving on the city council then becoming mayor of Newport News, Virginia from 1926 to 1930.

References

Mayors of Newport News, Virginia